Peter William Bone  (born 19 October 1952) is a British Conservative Party politician who served as Deputy Leader of the House of Commons in 2022. He has been the Member of Parliament (MP) for Wellingborough since 2005. He campaigned for Brexit in the EU referendum and was part of the political advisory board of Leave Means Leave.

Early life and education
Bone was born in 1952 in Billericay and educated at Westcliff High School for Boys.

Business career
Bone qualified as a chartered accountant in 1976.

Political career
In 1978, Bone was elected as a councillor for the Blenheim ward on Southend-on-Sea Borough Council, where he served for eight years until 1986. He was elected as the Deputy Chairman of the Southend West Conservative Association in 1977 and continued in the position until 1984. In 1982, he became press secretary to the Conservative MP Paul Channon.

He unsuccessfully contested the parliamentary seat of Islwyn in the South Wales valleys at the 1992 general election against the then Leader of the Opposition Neil Kinnock. He subsequently fought the European Parliament election in 1994 for Mid and West Wales coming third and suffering a swing against his party of 7.5%.

Bone was a member of the National Union Executive Committee between 1993 until 1996. He was chosen for the seemingly safe Conservative seat of Pudsey following the retirement of the veteran MP Giles Shaw at the 1997 general election but lost following a swing of 13.20% to the Labour's Paul Truswell, compared to a national swing of 10% from Conservative to Labour.

In the 2001 general election he fought the ultra-marginal seat of Wellingborough, where the sitting Labour MP Paul Stinchcombe was holding on with a majority of just 187, having defeated the veteran Tory MP Peter Fry in 1997. Stinchcombe held on to his seat by 2,355, a swing of 2.1% to Labour compared with a national swing of 1.75% to the Conservatives. However, four years later, in the 2005 general election, Bone ousted Stinchcombe in Wellingborough with a majority of 687 votes, a swing of 2.9% compared to a national swing of 3.1% to the Conservatives. He made his maiden speech on 7 June 2005.

Early on in his career he was described as one of the most active MPs in Parliament, in terms of Questions asked and other contributions. However, the quality of those interventions was questioned in a 2006 article in The Times about the Theyworkforyou website. Bone was one of three MPs specifically alleged to have "boosted their ratings on the internet by saying very little, very often." Among his 109 speeches was one which ran to three short sentences (standing up for Royal Mail in that a sub-postmaster in Little Irchester had the only business in the village). He regularly referenced his then wife "Mrs Bone" in questions to the Prime Minister's Questions.

Bone is a member of the 1922 Committee and was an executive member from 2007 to 2012. In April 2012, The Daily Telegraph reported that the modernising "301 Group" was planning a coup to replace Bone and others. Bone was voted off the executive in May 2012.

In March 2009, Bone was one of the key speakers opposing the use of the House of Commons by the UK Youth Parliament, having been appointed one of the Tellers.

Although Bone was not mentioned in the 2009 Legg Report that was central to the official investigation into the United Kingdom parliamentary expenses scandal and therefore was not one of the 343 MPs required to pay back any money, he was subject to some later reports relating to his expenses. He was one of 32 MPs who claimed the maximum allowance of £4,800 a year for food in 2010 and came under investigation in 2014 for expenses claims relating to the upkeep of his second home. In 2016 he was reported to be one of 26 MPs who had expenses debts of up to £500 written off after failing to pay them by the Independent Parliamentary Standards Authority and in 2016 was criticised for using the government's help-to-buy scheme, which was meant to help young first time buyers, to buy himself a new constituency home.

Bone proposed a bill in July 2013, arguing that the August Bank Holiday should be renamed to Margaret Thatcher Day to commemorate her premiership. The bill ran out of time, due to filibustering by Labour MPs and formally ended its passage through Parliament in 2014.

In February 2014, The Times newspaper reported that Bone had been under investigation by the police for the previous 12 months relating to an alleged £100,000 fraud concerning benefit payments of care home fees for his mother-in-law. Bone issued a lengthy statement denying fraud allegations. In March 2014 the Crown Prosecution Service said it had concluded that there was insufficient evidence to bring criminal charges.

Bone was frequently critical of the Coalition Government between the Conservative Party and the Liberal Democrats. In the 2015 general election, he increased his majority by 1,347 achieving 52.1% of the votes cast. He was re-elected again in the 2017 general election.

In February 2018, following the announcement that Northamptonshire County Council had brought in a "section 114" notice, putting it in special measures following a crises in its finances, Bone was one of seven local MPs who released a statement arguing that the problems with the authority were down to mismanagement from the Conservative councillors who led it rather than funding cuts from the Conservative Government. They further argued that government commissioners should take over the running of the council.

In Parliament, he serves on the Procedure Committee, the Committee on Exiting the European Union and the Panel of Chairs. He has previously been a member of the Trade and Industry Select Committee, the Health Select Committee, the Backbench Business Committee, the Joint Committee on Statutory Instruments and the Commons Committee on Statutory Instruments.

Before they separated, Bone employed his wife, Jennie, as his executive secretary. In 2007–2008 he paid her "in the top bracket of up to £40,000" per annum. The practice of MPs employing family members has been criticised by some sections of the media as nepotism. Although MPs who were first elected in 2017 have been banned from employing family members, the restriction is not retrospective – meaning that Bone's employment of his wife was lawful.

In June 2018, Bone defended fellow Conservative MP Christopher Chope after he was widely criticised for blocking a Private member's bill to make it illegal to take photos of people aimed up their skirts. Bone said that Chope was "a great parliamentarian and public servant" and stated that "a government upskirting bill should be introduced soon, properly scrutinised and will become law much faster than by the Private member's bill route."

In the 2019 general election, Bone increased his majority over Labour to 18,540, achieving 62.2% of the votes cast.

After the 2022 British cabinet reshuffle, he was promoted to the frontbench for the first time as Deputy Leader of the House of Commons. He voted for Liz Truss to be the new Conservative leader and was part of her transition team, however he was sacked from his ministerial role after she became Prime Minister.

Political views
Bone is regarded as being on the right wing of the Conservative Party, and is a member of the socially conservative Cornerstone Group. He has suggested major constitutional changes such as abolition of the Whips office and confirmation of new Cabinet appointees. His criticisms of the NHS include a 2007 report in which he argued that it "would not be out of place in Stalin's Russia". He has voted to lower the abortion time limit to twelve weeks and voted against abolishing the offences of blasphemy and blasphemous libel. He has urged the Charity Commission to award the tax breaks of registration to any legal faith group. The abortion time limit vote failed, the blasphemy vote passed, and tax breaks were not awarded.

In 2009, Bone opposed the introduction of the National Minimum Wage, which he claimed would "condemn hundreds of thousands to the dole queue", and later backed a private member's bill tabled by his colleague Christopher Chope proposing to enable employees to opt out of the minimum wage.

In 2009, Bone said: "We have gone from having one of the best health services in the Western world to arguably the worst", which had "centralised and Stalinist management".

Bone described government proposals to introduce same-sex marriage rights as "completely nuts". He subsequently voted against the Marriage (Same Sex Couples) Act 2013.

In 2013, Bone was one of four MPs who camped outside Parliament in a move to facilitate parliamentary debate on what they called an "Alternative Queen's Speech" – an attempt to show what a future Conservative government might deliver. Forty-two policies were listed including reintroduction of the death penalty and conscription, privatising the BBC, banning the burka in public places and preparation to leave the European Union. The Daily Telegraph believes the whips sent Edward Leigh to try to persuade the group not to table the amendments. Bone blamed the Liberal Democrats for tying David Cameron's hands.

A prominent Eurosceptic, Bone was often named as a potential defector to the United Kingdom Independence Party. In 2014, Bone described UKIP's emergence as a "good thing for British politics", and criticised his own party for "neglecting" the views of traditional Conservatives on other issues such as immigration, but said he intended to campaign for withdrawal from the EU from within the Conservative Party. Bone is a director of Grassroots Out and was a director of the now dissolved Go Movement Limited with Nigel Farage and Tom Pursglove.

In September 2019, Bone said that a general election would be a "good thing" and a necessary step in order to establish a "Conservative government with a majority" and prevent a no-deal Brexit. Bone said that Boris Johnson would be an "excellent prime minister and get a proper Brexit deal and lead us to victory in the next general election". On 6 June 2022, after a vote of no confidence in Johnson's leadership was called, Bone announced that he would vote in support of him.

Personal life
Bone primarily lives in London, but also owns a flat in the Denington Estate (formally John Lea School site) in Wellingborough. He married Jeanette Sweeney in 1981; together they had two sons and a daughter. In 2016, Bone separated from his wife, who is a Conservative Councillor in the Borough of Wellingborough and he is currently in a relationship with physiotherapist Helen Harrison, who is now his Executive Secretary.

Bone played cricket as a left-arm bowler for Cambridge Methodists Cricket Club in Leeds. He has also played cricket as a member of a Parliamentarians team, alongside Crispin Blunt and Hugh Robertson. He is an active member of the Church of England and attends St Mary's Church in Rushden, as well as holding constituency surgeries in the church hall.

Bone contracted COVID-19 in 2021.

In March 2022, a 51-year-old man from Wellingborough pleaded guilty to three malicious communications offences of sending abusive and offensive messages to Bone's office phone. He was sentenced to 12 weeks in prison, suspended for 12 months.

References

External links
 Peter Bone MP biography at the site of the Conservative Party
 Wellingborough Conservatives
 BBC Politics page
 

1952 births
Living people
People from Billericay
People educated at Westcliff High School for Boys
Conservative Party (UK) MPs for English constituencies
UK MPs 2005–2010
UK MPs 2010–2015
UK MPs 2015–2017
UK MPs 2017–2019
UK MPs 2019–present
British Eurosceptics
Conservative Party (UK) councillors